The Urdu Bazaar (literally, 'Urdu market') is a major market in the walled city of Delhi, India that connected the canal in the middle of Chandni Chowk to Jama Masjid. The original market was destroyed in the aftermath of Indian Rebellion of 1857, but its name survives as a location near the Jama Masjid.

The Urdu language obtained its name from this market.
Ghalib lamented on the destruction of Delhi in the aftermath of the failure of the 1857 rebellion: "My dear man, when Urdu Bazaar is no more, where is Urdu? By God, Delhi is no more a city, but a camp, a cantonment. No Fort, no city, no bazaars, ..."
Delhi's first Chief Executive Councillor and noted freedom fighter, Mir Mushtaq Ahmad, was a resident here prior to and during his term in office and founded the Janata Cooperative Bank in Urdu Bazaar in 1956 for the benefit of local businesses and residents. His premises also hosted periodic meetings of nationally reputed poets and intellectuals.

Today, the main book publishing, printing and selling markets of the Pakistani cities such as Lahore, Karachi, Rawalpindi are also known as Urdu Bazaar.

Also a virtual Urdu Bazaar is an online platform started by Wasi Zaidi mainly focused on Books.

See also

References

External links 
Chandni Chowk's website
For travellers
Small Description
Urdu Bazaar Books

Bazaars
Bazaars in India
Central Delhi district
Neighbourhoods in Delhi
Retail markets in Delhi
Tourist attractions in Delhi
Urdu-language culture